Kudafushi as a place name may refer to:
 Kudafushi (Laamu Atoll) (Republic of Maldives)
 Kudafushi (Raa Atoll) (Republic of Maldives)
 Kudafushi (Noonu Atoll) (Republic of Maldives)